Kevin Ngapoula-Mbembo (born 31 December 1979) is a Congolese judoka. He competed in the men's half-lightweight event at the 2000 Summer Olympics.

References

External links
 

1979 births
Living people
Republic of the Congo male judoka
Olympic judoka of the Republic of the Congo
Judoka at the 2000 Summer Olympics
Place of birth missing (living people)
21st-century Democratic Republic of the Congo people